The Mityana–Kalangaalo–Bukuya–Kiboga Road is a road in Uganda, connecting the towns of Mityana, and Kalangaalo in Mityana District, Bukuya in Mubende District, to Kiboga in Kiboga District.

Location
The road starts at Mityana, on the Mityana–Mubende Road, in the center of Mityana town. The coordinates of the road near Kalangaalo are 0°34'20.0"N, 31°56'52.0"E (Latitude:0.572223; Longitude:31.947783).

Overview
This road is an important transport corridor connecting Kiboga District, Mubende District, and Mityana District. The section between Bukuya and Kiboga is common to this road and to Myanzi–Kassanda–Bukuya–Kiboga Road. From Bukuya, the former lies nearly entirely in Mityana District, while the latter lies in Mubende District. Flooding is a challenge on these roads. The Mityana–Bukuya–Kiboga Road is a murram-surfaced road, in varying stages of disrepair, especially the section between Bulera and Kyamusisi.

See also
 Uganda National Roads Authority

References

External links
 Webpage of Uganda National Road Authority

Roads in Uganda
Kiboga District
Mubende District
Mityana District
Central Region, Uganda